The 1949–50 NBA season was the inaugural season of the National Basketball Association, which was created in 1949 by merger of the 3-year-old BAA and 12-year-old NBL. The 1950 NBA playoffs ended with the Minneapolis Lakers winning the NBA Championship, beating the Syracuse Nationals in 6 games in the NBA Finals.

Commonly 1949–50 is counted as the fourth NBA season. It recognizes the three BAA seasons (1946–47, 1947–48 and 1948–49) as part of its own history, sometimes without comment.

Notable occurrences 
 The Indianapolis Jets and Providence Steamrollers folded after the 1948–49 season, leaving the BAA with 10 teams. Excluding the Jets, three of those teams had joined the BAA from the National Basketball League (NBL) one year before.
 Six NBL franchises – (Anderson, Denver, Sheboygan, Syracuse, Tri-Cities, and Waterloo) and one expansion team (Indianapolis Olympians) – joined with the ten surviving BAA teams to create the National Basketball Association with 17 teams.

Final standings
In this inaugural NBA season only, the ten surviving teams from 1948–49 BAA season played a heavy schedule of games with each other and a light schedule with the seven NBL participants in the merger that created the league, and vice versa.

Eastern Division

Syracuse played a heavy schedule of 44 games against Western Division teams: on average just over seven games each, same as they played each other (35 to 37 games against five Western rivals). The Western Division teams were generally weaker on the court; none of the teams there won half of its games played outside the division. Yet Syracuse won at the same 80% rate against the East and Central (16–4) as they did against the West (35–9).

Central Division

To define first and third place, the Lakers played one game against the Royals, while the Stags played one against the Pistons, preliminary to the 1950 NBA playoffs.

The five Central Division teams and five Eastern teams beside Syracuse — that is, the ten former BAA teams – uniformly played 68 games: six games in each pairing among themselves (54) and two games each against each of the Western teams and Syracuse (14).

Western Division

The six Western Division teams and Syracuse—that is, the seven NBL participants in the merger—uniformly played two games each against every one of the ten BAA 1949 teams, the East and Central teams except Syracuse (20 games each). They played seven or nine games in each pairing among themselves (at least 42 games).

x – clinched playoff spot

Playoffs

Statistics leaders

Note: Prior to the 1969–70 season, league leaders in points and assists were determined by totals rather than averages.

NBA awards

All-NBA First Team:
Max Zaslofsky, Chicago Stags
Bob Davies, Rochester Royals
Alex Groza, Indianapolis Olympians
George Mikan, Minneapolis Lakers
Jim Pollard, Minneapolis Lakers

All-NBA Second Team:
Ralph Beard, Indianapolis Olympians
Frank Brian, Anderson Packers
Al Cervi, Syracuse Nationals
Fred Schaus, Fort Wayne Pistons
Dolph Schayes, Syracuse Nationals

References
General source: 1949–50 NBA Season Summary basketball-reference.com. Retrieved August 31, 2010.